The 2010 Rally Islas Canarias was the fourth round of the 2010 Intercontinental Rally Challenge (IRC) season. The fifteen stage asphalt rally took place on the island of Gran Canaria between 29 April and 1 May 2010. The rally, which is also a round of the Spanish Asphalt Championship, was a late entry in the IRC calendar after the withdrawal of the Rally Principe de Asturias.

Introduction
The rally was based in the capital Las Palmas with a ceremonial start on Thursday 29 April 2010. In addition to a host of local drivers and those who travelled from Spain, several leading IRC competitors confirmed that they were taking part in the event. They included Jan Kopecký, Guy Wilks and Juho Hanninen representing Škoda with Bruno Magalhães and Kris Meeke entered for Peugeot.

Results

Overall

Special stages

References

External links 
 The official website for the rally
 The official website of the Intercontinental Rally Challenge

Canary Islands
Rally Islas Canarias
Sport in Gran Canaria